Robert "Rob" Pike (born 1956) is a Canadian programmer and author. He is best known for his work on the Go programming language and at Bell Labs, where he was a member of the Unix team and was involved in the creation of the Plan 9 from Bell Labs and Inferno operating systems, as well as the Limbo programming language.

He also co-developed the Blit graphical terminal for Unix; before that he wrote the first window system for Unix in 1981. Pike is the sole inventor named in US patent 4,555,775.

Over the years Pike has written many text editors; sam and acme are the most well known and are still in active use and development.

Pike, with Brian Kernighan, is the co-author of The Practice of Programming and The Unix Programming Environment. With Ken Thompson he is the co-creator of UTF-8. Pike also developed lesser systems such as the vismon program for displaying faces of email authors.

Pike also appeared once on Late Night with David Letterman, as a technical assistant to the comedy duo Penn & Teller.

Pike worked at Google from 2002 to 2021 when he retired. While at Google, he has been involved in the creation of the programming languages  Go and Sawzall. 

Pike is married to author and illustrator Renée French; the couple live in both the US and Australia.

See also 
The plumber – the interprocess communications mechanism used in Plan 9 and Inferno
Mark V. Shaney – an artificial Usenet poster designed by Pike

References

External links 

 The Good, the Bad, and the Ugly: The Unix Legacy – Slides of his presentation at the commemoration of 1000000000 seconds of the Unix clock.Archive on cat-v.org
 Systems Software Research is Irrelevant (a.k.a. utah2000) slidesps file
 Pike's personal homepage
 Pike's Google homepage 
 Pike's page on cat-v.org
 Pike's page on C archive
 Questions and Answers with Rob Pike by Robin "Roblimo" Miller (published in Slashdot in October 2004)
 Interview on informit.comAnother interview
 Interview on infoworld.com
 Interview on red-gate.com
 Interview on usesthis.com
  (Google Tech Talks May 9, 2007)
 Structural Regular Expressions by Rob Pike slides
 The history of UTF-8 as told by Rob Piketext file
 
 

1956 births
Living people
Canadian computer scientists
Computer programmers
Canadian technology writers
Unix people
Google employees
Plan 9 people
Inferno (operating system) people
Scientists at Bell Labs
Programming language designers